John Charles White (2 October 1942 – 20 June 2020) was a Tasmanian Labor politician during the years 1986 to 1999. He was the son of Alfred White (MHA from 1941–1959).

White was first elected as a member for Denison in 1986. He held the position of Health Minister during 1989–1992. During 1992–1998 he was shadow minister for arts, justice, environment and Aboriginal affairs. In August 1998 he resigned from his lower house seat to contest the upper house seat of Newdegate. He was successful and took the position in September 1998.

In June 1999, Newdegate was abolished when the size of parliament was reduced.

In early 2003, White and two others formed a company called Tasmanian Compliance Corporation (TCC). In August 2003 the company was awarded a Tasmanian government contract to handle building accreditation, complaints and training.

Following the 2006 state election, White came under significant public scrutiny after a confidential service level agreement, signed by White and the minister Bryan Green which was being negotiated from November 2005, was leaked to Sue Neales, chief reporter of The Mercury, who was later criticised by the Chief Justice for her "contempt of court".

After initially pleading not guilty, the Chief Justice ruled that the signing of the document was the offence, and did not require any 'mala fides' (bad faith). White then changed his plea to guilty, on legal advice of his barrister, in the Supreme Court on 20 November 2007. On 10 December 2007, he was sentenced to a two-year good behaviour bond and had no conviction recorded.

References

External links
 

1942 births
2020 deaths
Members of the Tasmanian House of Assembly
Members of the Tasmanian Legislative Council
Australian Labor Party members of the Parliament of Tasmania